Alexander Huber (Cyrillic: Александр Хубер, romanized: Aleksandr Khuber; born 25 February 1985) is a Tajikistani retired professional footballer who played as a defender.

Early life
Huber was born in Leninabad of the Soviet Union and came in 1989 to Neustadt by Marburg in Germany.

Club career
Huber began his career in 1993 with his born club Khujand. He also began his career in late-1993 with his home town club VfL Neustadt. In summer 1999, he was scouted by Eintracht Frankfurt where  promoted in 2004 to the first team. After seven games in his first season in the 2. Bundesliga, he was loaned out in January 2006 to Regionalliga West/Südwest club TSG 1899 Hoffenheim. He played six matches for Hoffenheim until the end of the season. He returned to Eintracht Frankfurt in summer 2006 and played until December 2006 for the team before was transferred to Eintracht Braunschweig. After Braunschweig's relegation he was unattached and trained at his old club in Frankfurt until he was signed by the Hamburger SV reserve team. After one year with Hamburger SV II, he signed in summer 2008 for Kickers Offenbach.

In the summer of 2017, Huber announced his retirement from football.

International career
Huber played nine games and scored one goal for the Germany U-20 national team. He played for the team at the 2005 FIFA World Youth Championship in the Netherlands, and later marked a game for the Germany Team 2006. He also hold a Tadjik passport.

On 2 June 2017, Huber was called up to the Tajikistan national team for the first time, for their 2019 AFC Asian Cup qualification Third Round match against the Philippines on 13 June 2017, making his debut playing the first 45 minutes of the game.

Career statistics

Club

International

References

External links
 
 
 
 
 

Living people
1985 births
Association football midfielders
Tajikistani footballers
Tajikistan international footballers
Tajikistani people of German descent
Citizens of Germany through descent
German footballers
Germany B international footballers
Germany youth international footballers
Russian and Soviet-German people
Tajikistani expatriate footballers
Eintracht Frankfurt players
Eintracht Frankfurt II players
TSG 1899 Hoffenheim players
Eintracht Braunschweig players
Hamburger SV II players
Kickers Offenbach players
FSV Frankfurt players
Bundesliga players
2. Bundesliga players
3. Liga players